This is a list of mayors of Winterthur, Canton of Zürich, Switzerland. The mayor of Winterthur (Stadtpräsident von Winterthur) presides over the city council (Stadtrat).

Winterthur
Winterthur
Mayors of Winterthur, List
 
Lists of mayors (complete 1900-2013)